The following is a list of Singaporean electoral divisions from 1959 to 1963 that served as constituencies that elected members to the 2nd Legislative Assembly of Singapore in the 1959 Singaporean general elections. The number of seats was increased to 51 while the People's Action Party (PAP) won a landslide victory with 43 seats.

Constituencies

References

External links 
 

1959